Girls At Sea is a 1958 British comedy film directed by Gilbert Gunn and starring Ronald Shiner as Marine Ogg and Warren Mitchell as Arthur. It was based on a play by Ian Hay and Stephen King-Hall, previously filmed as The Middle Watch in 1930 and under the same title in 1940.

Plot
Officers throw an extravagant party on board the battleship HMS Scotia when it visits the French Riviera. At the end of the night, the final shore-boat is judged unseaworthy, and three attractive female guests, Mary (Ann Kimball), Jill (Mary Steele) and Antoinette (Nadine Tallier), must spend the night on board ship. But before they can be escorted ashore the next day, the battleship is called out on manoeuvres off the coast of Italy. Having no choice but to take the women along, Captain Maitland (Guy Rolfe) must hide the girls presence from the admiral (Michael Hordern).

Cast
 Guy Rolfe as Captain Alwin Maitland
 Ronald Shiner as Marine Ogg
 Alan White as Commander
 Michael Hordern as Admiral Reginald Victor Hewitt	
 Anne Kimbell as Mary Carlton
 Nadine Tallier as Antoinette
 Fabia Drake as Lady Kitty Hewitt
 Mary Steele as Jill Eaton
 Richard Coleman as Captain Robert 'Bobby' Randall
 Lionel Jeffries as Harry, the Tourist
 Teddy Johnson as Singer
 Daniel Massey as Flag Lieutenant Courtney
 David Lodge as Corporal Duckett
 Warren Mitchell as Arthur
 Michael Ripper as Jumper, Marine
 Mercy Haystead as Claudine
 Brian Wilde as Bill
 Harold Goodwin as Wal
 David Aylmer as Navigating Officer
 Richard Briers as 'Popeye' Lewis

Critical reception
The Radio Times wrote, "The 1940s film version of the stage farce The Middle Watch, which starred Jack Buchanan, was pretty bad, but beside this tepid remake it looks like a comedy classic. The cast does its level best to pep up the tired material...Ronald Shiner is cheeky and Michael Hordern is absent-mindedly authoritarian, but Guy Rolfe is as wooden as a figurehead, while all the girls get to do is rush around in a state of undress. Try another form of naval gazing instead" whereas TV Guide called it "An amusing comedy"; and Allmovie noted, "Michael Hordern has some dryly amusing moments as the hapless Admiral."

References

External links
 

1958 films
1958 comedy films
Films shot at Associated British Studios
British comedy films
Military humor in film
Films based on works by Ian Hay
Films scored by Laurie Johnson
1950s English-language films
Films directed by Gilbert Gunn
1950s British films